The Kikuyu white-eye (Zosterops kikuyensis) is a species of bird in the family Zosteropidae. It includes numerous subspecies, sometimes considered a subspecies of montane white-eye (Z. poliogastrus). It is found in central Kenya, in the Aberdare Mountains and on Mount Kenya. IUCN categorizes it as of least concern.

References

Zosterops
Birds of East Africa
Birds described in 1891